The Hong Kong Outstanding Teens Election is a biannual election in Hong Kong. It aims at recognizing exceptional personal achievement or overcoming of challenges, encouraging contribution to society, and impacting other young people with winners' personal stories.

The election is coorganized by the Hong Kong Playground Association and Radio Television Hong Kong Channel 2 and supported by the Hong Kong Ten Outstanding Young Persons' Association and the Hong Kong Outstanding Teens Association. Every other year ten teenagers are selected to be Hong Kong Outstanding Teens while another twenty receive merit awards. The award itself is presented by the First Lady of Hong Kong: formerly, Selina Tsang (wife of Donald Tsang, the second Chief Executive) and Betty Tung (wife of Tung Chee-hwa, the first Chief Executive). Winners in each election publish together a book to share their experiences and aspirations.

Eligibility and criteria of selection

Teenagers living in Hong Kong between the ages of 11 and 17 including disabled persons are eligible to apply.

Apart from those who possess exceptional academic and extracurricular achievement and good character, candidates who actively participate in community service or demonstrate outstanding resilience facing physical, personal, family or other challenges are also recognized.

Classes of selection

The selection is divided into three classes, of which applicants may choose when applying. They are respectively 1. Class of Personal Achievement 2. Class of Exceptional Personal Endeavor and 3. Class of Outstanding Social Contribution.

Elections

References

External links
Hong Kong Outstanding Teens Association

Education in Hong Kong